Dapu Town (大浦镇) is a town in Yixing City, Jiangsu Province, China. It is near Lake Tai.

Yixing